Tim Lewis (born 1961) is an American football coach and former player.

Tim or Timothy  Lewis may also refer to:

 Tim Lewis (racewalker) (born 1962), American Olympic athlete
 Tim Lewis (basketball) (born 1967), British basketball coach 
 Tim Lewis (politician), American politician in the New Mexico House of Representatives
 Thighpaulsandra (Tim Lewis), Welsh experimental musician
 Timothy K. Lewis (born 1954), American federal judge
 Timothy Richards Lewis (1841–1886), Welsh surgeon and pathologist

See also